Since 1978, the conflict between Republic of Turkey and various Kurdish insurgent groups, especially Kurdistan Workers' Party (PKK) caused deaths of 40,000 to 55,000 people from both sides including many civilians. Many military cemeteries for the military casualties of the conflict was established by the Turkish government. The list below lists all military cemeteries for the soldiers who died in the conflict. Military cemeteries that originally wasn't established for Kurdish–Turkish conflict casualties but later expanded in a way to include Kurdish–Turkish conflict casualties are included in this list. For monuments and memorials see List of monuments and memorials to the Kurdish–Turkish conflict

List

References 

Military cemeteries
Kurdish–Turkish conflict (1978–present)